Blizhny is a rural locality (a khutor) in Glazunovskoye Rural Settlement, Kumylzhensky District, Volgograd Oblast, Russia. The population was 2 as of 2010.

Geography 
Blizhny is located in forest steppe, on Khopyorsko-Buzulukskaya Plain, 33 km east of Kumylzhenskaya (the district's administrative centre) by road. Stoylovsky is the nearest rural locality.

References 

Rural localities in Kumylzhensky District